Tokuda Yasokichi I (20 November 1873 – 20 February 1956）(徳田八十吉) was a Japanese potter. He specialised in Kutani ware.

Successors 
His grandson, Tokuda Yasokichi III (1933–2009), was designated a Living National Treasure for his saiyu glaze technique. He interpreted Kutani in a new way with abstract, colourful designs. His works are held in many museums, including the British Museum and the Metropolitan Museum of Art.

He was succeeded by his daughter (b. 1961), who was allowed to inherit the name, becoming Tokuda Yasokichi IV, to prevent it from becoming extinct. As a female head, she is exceptional among ceramic family dynasties in Japan.

References 

Japanese potters
1873 births
1956 deaths

ja:徳田八十吉